The Propeller was a weekly English language newspaper published in Hurstville, New South Wales, Australia.

Newspaper history 
The Propeller began publication on 10 March 1911 and continued until 31 December 1969. It was published by the Wennholm Bros. It began with a print run of 2000 copies and was free of charge.

Its successor was the St George and Sutherland Shire Leader which was founded in 1960 and continues to this day.

Digitisation 
The newspaper has been digitised as part of the Australian Newspapers Digitisation Program of the National Library of Australia.

See also 
 List of newspapers in Australia
 List of newspapers in New South Wales

References

External links 
 St George & Sutherland Shire Leader
 

Defunct newspapers published in Sydney
Georges River Council